Prudentia (minor planet designation: 474 Prudentia) (1901 GD) is a Main-belt asteroid discovered on 13 February 1901 by Max Wolf at Heidelberg.

References

External links 
 
 

Background asteroids
Prudentia
19010213
Prudentia